Phaeochromycin A is an anti-inflammatory polyketide isolated from Streptomyces.

External links
 Phaeochromycins A-E, anti-inflammatory polyketides isolated from the soil actinomycete Streptomyces phaeochromogenes LL-P018

Naphthalenes
Polyketides
2-Pyrones